Solomon Tettey Terkper is a Ghanaian politician and a member of the Second Parliament of the Fourth republic representing the
Upper Manyo Krobo constituency in the Eastern Region of Ghana.

Early life 
Terkper was born in Upper Manyo Krobo in the Eastern Region of Ghana.

Politics 
He was first elected into Parliament on the Ticket of the National Democratic Congress for the Upper Manyo Krobo in the Eastern Region of Ghana in the December 1996 Ghanaian general election. He polled 15,390 votes out of the 26,621 valid votes representing 43.30% over his opponents Emmanuel Ansah Nartey who polled 4,827 votes representing 13.60%, Charles Kwesi Narh who polled 3,173 votes representing 8.90%, Joe Sam who polled 2,644 votes representing 7.40% and Martin Adama Okai who polled 587 votes representing 1.70%. He joined the Convention People's Party in 2000 and lost to Stephen Kwao Amoanor of the National Democratic Congress.

References 

Ghanaian MPs 1997–2001
Living people
21st-century Ghanaian politicians
National Democratic Congress (Ghana) politicians
People from Eastern Region (Ghana)
Year of birth missing (living people)